The Troutdale Library is a branch of the Multnomah County Library, in Troutdale in the U.S. state of Oregon. The library, part of the Cherry Park Market Center, offers the Multnomah County Library catalog of two million books, periodicals and other materials.

History
In November 2009, the Multnomah County Library leased a space in a shopping center to start a branch in Troutdale. The  retail space was then renovated the next year by general contractor Brockamp & Jaeger. The renovations were designed by Hennebery Eddy Architects, and were completed in time for an opening in July 2010.

See also

 History of libraries
 Library science
 List of Carnegie libraries in Oregon

References

External links
 

2010 establishments in Oregon
Libraries established in 2010
Multnomah County Library
Troutdale, Oregon